Woody Island, also called Yongxing Island by China and Taiwan and Phú Lâm Island by Vietnam, is the largest of the Paracel Islands in the South China Sea (SCS), with an area of . As of 2014, it has a population of almost 1,500, with roads, banks and an air strip. 

The Paracel Islands are a group of islands, reefs, banks and atolls in the northwestern part of the South China Sea. Woody Island is part of the Amphitrite Group in the eastern Paracels and is approximately equidistant from Hainan and the Vietnam coast.

The island has been under the control of the People's Republic of China (PRC) since 1956. Sansha City, which administers PRC-controlled territories in Spratly and Paracel Islands, has its administrative seat located on the island. The island is claimed by the Republic of China (ROC, Taiwan) and Vietnam.

History
The Chinese Qing dynasty, France (on behalf of Annam), Japan, and the Republic of China had all established a presence on the island at various points of time in history. Fishing activities in the South China Sea region surrounding the island have been documented in the records of earlier Chinese dynasties. During the Ming dynasty (1368–1644), Zheng He plotted the location of surrounding islands on a map, but never landed on it.

In 1909 Zhang Renjun, the Viceroy of Liangguang ordered Guangdong Fleet Admiral Li Zhun to sail to the island. His mission landed in June 1909. In 1932 French Indochina announced its claim to the archipelago. A Franco-Vietnamese garrison was established on Woody Island (called 'ile Boisée' in French) in 1938, regularly supplied by the French Navy until 1945.

The island was occupied by Japan during World War II. 4 Feb 1945
USS Pargo (Lt.Cdr. D.B. Bell) bombards Woody Island east of Tourane, French Indochina, destroying a Japanese weather station and radio equipment, an administration building, a jetty, and several fishing boats. Following Japan's surrender at the end of the war, the Nationalist Chinese government sent naval expeditions to the South China Sea in 1946 to claim the Spratly and Paracel Islands, and established a permanent presence on Woody Island and Itu Aba. They (re)named Woody Island "Yongxing (Yung-hsing) Island" after one of the Republic of China Navy warships, ROCS Yung-hsing. Yung-hsing was formerly  transferred to the ROC navy after the war. In January 1947, after making a failed attempt to dislodge the Chinese garrison from Woody Island, France established a permanent presence on Pattle Island in the western Paracels.

After the Hainan Island Campaign in 1950 during the Chinese Civil War, the ROC garrisons on Woody Island and Itu Aba were withdrawn to Taiwan. France had a chance to take over the islands, but decided not to, for fear of compromising its interests with the newly established PRC. The islands were thus unoccupied for six years, except for seasonal inhabitation (occupation) by fishermen from Hainan. In 1956, the PRC established a permanent presence on Woody Island.

The Republic of Vietnam (South Vietnam) continued to claim its sovereignty over the Crescent Group in the western part of the Paracel Islands after assuming control from the departing French colonialists against whom Vietnam fought a bitter independence war, maintaining a military garrison on Pattle Island (Vietnamese: đảo Hoàng Sa) by Ngo Dinh Diem's executive order from 1956. For the 20 years thereafter, conflicts between the two sides repeatedly erupted within the region. In January 1974, the PLA Navy captured Pattle Island during the Battle of the Paracel Islands.

Climate
The island is located between the equator and the tropic of cancer, and falls in the "tropical marine monsoon climate" category. It experiences abundant rainfall, year-round high temperatures, high humidity and high salt. The rainy season lasts for 5 to 6 months every year.

Claims and disputes

Under PRC control, the island is administered by the Yongxingdao Town Government and is the seat of Sansha, a prefecture-level city of Hainan. In June 2014, UK newspaper The Independent stated that the island had a population of 1,443.

As part of the Paracel Islands, the island is also claimed by Taiwan and by Vietnam.

Structures and facilities
Sansha city is located on Woody island. Woody Island has had two or three artificial harbors capable of docking vessels up to 5,000 tonnes. In 2008, the island's main sea transport was the freighter Qiongsha-3, (2,500 tonnes, 84m x 13.8m, 200 passengers and 750 tonnes of cargo); it was the only means of sea transport for non-military personnel such as fishermen and researchers. Each trip from Hainan to Woody island lasted from 13 to 15 hours.

In 1990, Chinese authorities built a runway and airport on the island. The Yongxing Island Airport was completed in July 1990, with a 2,700-metre runway that is capable of handling any fourth generation fighter aircraft of the PLA Naval Air Force such as the Chengdu J-10AH, Shenyang J-11BH, Xian JH-7A, and Sukhoi Su-30MK2. Other constructions include three main roads and an 800-metre long cement causeway connecting to Rocky Island (石岛/đảo Đá).

Apart from government buildings and army posts, the island has various establishments. The island's administrative centre is located on Beijing Road, which has an Industrial and Commercial Bank of China branch, a hospital, various shops, hostels, food stations, a post office, small department stores and an aquatic company. A rescue centre was established on 15 July 2006.

There are two museums on the island – Xisha Maritime Museum and a Naval Museum. Other monuments include towers left by the Imperial Japanese Army during WWII, a monument erected by the ROC government in 1946, and a monument erected by the PRC in 1974. Visitors to the island are required to obtain approval from PRC authorities in Haikou before departure. Hiring a fishing boat from Hainan to the island is possible.

On 10 April 2011, China National Radio (CNR) and Hainan People's Broadcasting Station began FM broadcasts on the island.  This is in addition to mobile communications and satellite television which are available in the fishing villages of the Paracel Islands.

China began construction on a school to serve about 40 children whose parents work on the island in June 2014, with construction expected to cost about 36 million yuan and take a year and a half. It opened in December 2015.

On 17 February 2016, the New York Times reported that an HQ-9 Surface to Air Missile system had been deployed on the island. In July 2016, it was reported that Shenyang J-11BH fighter aircraft were deployed on the island.

In April 2017, the Asia Maritime Transparency Initiative – a US think tank based in Washington – reported that a Shenyang J-11BH fighter aircraft was spotted on the island in satellite photos taken on 29 March 2017.

On 22 July 2017, over 200 Chinese moviegoers attended a screening in a theater built on the island by the Hainan Film Company with up-to-date technology, including both 4K resolution and a 3-D perforated screen.

In May 2018, based on PLA Air Force defence circulars and Chinese social media posts, the Washington Post and Washington based Asia maritime transparency initiative reported that China had landed long range bombers on the island as part of a defense exercise.

In August 2020 the PLA Air Force deployed H-6J bombers to Woody Island.

Ecology and resources
The island's flora is generally tropical, with an abundance of palm trees. There is also a vegetable plantation sized around one-fifteenth of a hectare (~700 sq m).  The western portion of the island has a coconut grove. The island's domestic water supply is from rainwater collection. Additional drinking water is shipped from Hainan Island. Supply ships arrive monthly; during this time residents spend two days at the pier unloading materiel. A desalination plant completed in October 2016 is capable of treating 1,000 tonnes of seawater per day, bringing the total capacity of desalination equipment on the island to 1,800 tonnes of seawater per day.

Population
The island's civilian population generally consists of a small number of long-term fishermen's settlements maintained by a fisherman's village committee, and a larger number of short-term fishermen that visit the island, in addition to small numbers of government workers and tourists. Policemen and soldiers stationed on the island change shifts every two years, whereas civilian employees change shifts every six months.

Satellite images

See also

 Yongxing Island Airport
 Rocky Island
 South China Sea Islands

References

Bibliography

External links
 Aerial photos of Woody Island and its airport
 Satellite image of Woody Island by Google Maps
  (Includes a photo of the settlement and an accompanying photo gallery.)
 

Paracel Islands
Disputed territories in Asia
Territorial disputes of the Republic of China
Territorial disputes of Vietnam